Euphaedra aubergeri, or Auberger's forester, is a butterfly in the family Nymphalidae. It is found in north-western Ivory Coast. The habitat consists of forests.

References

Butterflies described in 1977
aubergeri
Endemic fauna of Ivory Coast
Butterflies of Africa